Greater Lawrence Technical School, established in 1965, is a four-year regional technical high school, located in Andover, Massachusetts, United States. It serves the communities of Andover, Lawrence, Methuen, and North Andover.

Programs
GLTS offers a number of career and technical education (CTE) programs:

 Automotive Collision & Repair
 Automotive Technology
 Biotechnology 
 Business Technology
 Carpentry
 Cosmetology
 Culinary Arts
 Dental Assisting
 Electrical
 Electrical Low Voltage Systems
 Health Careers
 Horticulture/Landscaping
 HVAC/R
 Information Technology
 Advanced Manufacturing (Machine Tool Tech)
 Medical Assisting
 Metal Fabrication & Joining Technologies
 Plumbing
 Robotics and Automation

References

External links
 Massachusetts Department of Education school profile

Commonwealth Athletic Conference
Schools in Essex County, Massachusetts
Buildings and structures in Andover, Massachusetts
School districts in Massachusetts
Vocational education
Public high schools in Massachusetts
1965 establishments in Massachusetts